Cuidado con el ángel (English title: Don't Mess with an Angel; lit. Be Careful with the Angel) is a Mexican telenovela produced by Nathalie Lartilleux for Televisa in 2008. It is an adaptation of the Venezuelan telenovela, Una muchacha llamada Milagros produced in 1974 by Venevisión. Each episode garnered nearly 5 million viewers daily.

On June 9, 2008, Canal de las Estrellas started broadcasting Cuidado con el ángel weekdays at 4:00pm, replacing Al diablo con los guapos. The last episode was broadcast on March 6, 2009 with Atrévete a soñar replacing it the following day.

Univision started broadcasting Cuidado con el ángel on September 22, 2008 weeknights at 8pm/7c, replacing Al diablo con los guapos. The last episode was broadcast on June 19, 2009 with Un gancho al corazón replacing it on June 22, 2009. Univision reruns Cuidado con el ángel from October 22, 2012 to July 19, 2013 replacing Sortilegio weekdays at 2pm/1c. The last episode was broadcast on July 19, 2013 with Cachito de cielo replacing it on July 22, 2013.

Maite Perroni and William Levy starred as protagonists.

Ana Patricia Rojo, Arturo Carmona, Rocío Banquells, Laura Zapata, Nailea Norvind, and Michelle Vieth starred as antagonists.

The leading actors Helena Rojo, Ricardo Blume, and Evita Muñoz "Chachita" starred as stellar performances.

Plot
María de Jesus, better known as Marichuy, is humble young girl living with Candelaria, a laundress who gave her a home when she was wandering on the streets. Candelaria is like a mother to Marichuy because she never met her biological mother as she was left in an orphanage when she was a baby. The abandonment has led her to believe her mother never loved her. Marichuy's biological mother, Cecilia Velarde, entrusted her baby to a priest, named Father Anselmo, who took the baby to an orphanage, after she thought she was dying. Now, she regrets making that decision and has spent most of her life searching for her lost child.

Marichuy also hides a horrible secret. At the age of 14, Marichuy ran away from the orphanage, and began to live on the streets, doing her best to survive. One night, she was attacked by a drunk man. She cannot seek justice for what happened to her because she did not see the man's face very well since she was attacked late at night. This experience, as well as having terrible recurrent nightmares, leaves her with a deep resentment towards men.

Juan Miguel San Román is a prestigious psychiatrist who has dedicated his time to the rehabilitation of young rebels and criminals. This serves as a distraction from his failing marriage to his wife Viviana and a horrible crime he committed during his youth while he was drunk. Once again, destiny brings Juan Miguel and Marichuy together when she is arrested with a group of friends. From that point, he vows to help Marichuy and he takes her to Judge Patricio Velarde's home, a very strict, heartless man, who is also her biological father.

As soon as Marichuy steps foot into the house, Cecilia welcomes her with open arms, but Judge Patricio despises her from the start due to her lack of manners. She also is not well received by the Velarde's daughter, Estefanía and her aunt, Isabela. Estefanía is not the Velarde's real daughter. She and her aunt schemed up a plan to have Cecilia believe that she had found her daughter, that way, they would both move into their mansion and not live in poverty anymore.

Eventually, Marichuy and Juan Miguel fall in love and get married. On their wedding night, Marichuy has the same nightmare, but this time she is able to recognize the man's face who is Juan Miguel, the love of her life. Marichuy runs out of the hotel room, devastated. Juan Miguel runs after her and tries to calm her. She apologizes but Juan Miguel confesses that her nightmares were, indeed, true. This enrages Marichuy and she runs off again and takes a bus back to Mexico City.

The next stage of the novela is Juan Miguel constantly begging Marichuy to forgive him and she rejecting him. She later finds out she is pregnant and decides to forgive him. Turns out however, that Juan Miguel's first wife Viviana is still alive and she returns pretending she lost her memory. Juan Miguel thinking Marichuy came to beg him for a divorce instead of coming to forgive him, screams about Viviana's return before Marichuy has a chance to speak. Devastated Marichuy leaves and hides out in a farm for a while.

Then begins the third stage of the novela. This stage consists of pregnant Marichuy hiding out in a farm of guy name Omar (better known as Leopardo) while taking a fake name of Lirio. While she is in the farm Leopardo falls in love with Lirio (really Marichuy) and she agrees to marry him, and she has Juan Miguel's kid. Everything appears to be going well for Marichuy. Meanwhile, Juan Miguel is missing Marichuy and is taking care of his supposedly memory-lost wife, Viviana. He hires a nanny, Blanca, to take care of his daughter Mayita. Blanca turns out to have multiple personality disorders and her other personality, Ivette, stabs Viviana, killing her. Juan Miguel takes the blame for the murder trying to help Blanca. Well Marichuy sees of his imprisonment in the newspaper and decides to go back, standing Leopardo up before their wedding, to hep Juan Miguel. However, Juan Miguel gets freed since Blanca confesses it was her (or at least kinda her since it was her other personality Ivette). He decides to marry Blanca in order to help her and make her feel supported.

Marichuy gets back but discovers Juan Miguel is engaged to Blanca and is heartbroken. She knows she lost Leopardo for coming back to help Juan Miguel so she doesn't know what to do and decides to pursue acting (having previously acted before hiding out in the farm). She starts working as a theater actress to support herself and her child, as well as Candelaria. Leopardo comes looking for her and turns out he is friends with Juan Miguel and they talk about their great love for a woman not knowing it is the same woman. At some point they discover Marichuy and Lirio are the same woman and Juan Miguel discovers he has a son with Marichuy. Many things happens but at the end of this stage of the novela Leopardo and Blanca get together and Marichuy goes blind after a bullet hits her in her head, luckily doesn't die.

Unfortunately, this is not enough for Marichuy and Juan Miguel to finally get together. Many other things happens in the novela, like; Marichuy losing her kid, Marichuy finding out she is a Velarde and forgiving her parents (after many episodes of hating them), Juan Miguel becoming an eye surgeon, Juan Miguel pretending to be someone else to be close to Marichuy since she is blind, and Juan Miguel giving Marichuy her sight back through a surgery. At the end, Juan Miguel and Marichuy finally get married again living happily ever after with their two kids.

Cast

Main
Maite Perroni as María de Jesus "Marichuy" Velarde Santos de San Román/Lirio/Alejandra Robles
William Levy as Juan Miguel San Román Bustos/Pablo Cisneros
Helena Rojo as Cecilia Santos de Velarde
Ana Patricia Rojo as Estefania Rojas/Estefania Velarde Santos
Laura Zapata as Onelia Montenegro
Nailea Norvind as Viviana Mayer Montenegro de San Román
Ricardo Blume as Patricio Velarde del Bosque 
Rocio Banquells as Isabella Rojas
Miguel Córcega as Padre Anselmo Vidal #1
 Héctor Gómez as Padre Anselmo Vidal #2
Michelle Vieth as Ana Julia Villaseñor
Evita Muñoz "Chachita" as Candelaria Martínez
Arturo Carmona as Amador Robles

Supporting
 
Sherlyn as Rocio San Román Bustos
África Zavala as Elsa Maldonado San Román Vda. de Acuña
Abraham Ramos as Adrían González
Georgina Salgado as Purificación "Purita"
Jorge da Silva as Eduardo Garibay
Ana Isabel Corral as Beatríz de Garibay
Elizabeth Dupeyrón as Luisa San Román de Maldonado
Jesús More as Vicente
Mauricio Mejía as Israel Pérez
Kelly Kellerman as Rebeca "Becky" Mendoza de Pérez
Saraí Meza as María Antonieta "Mayita" San Roman Mayer
Óscar Traven as Francisco Maldonado
Renata Flores as Martirio
Rodrigo Mejia as Nelson Acuña
Hish Alexis as Juan Miguel "Juanito" San Román Velarde
Sara Montes as Balbina
Beatriz Monroy as Casilda López
Rebeca Manríquez as Olga
Amparo Garrido as Clemencia
Vania Pardo as Dora

Guest stars 
 
Beatríz Aguirre as Mariana Bustos de San Román
Carlos Cámara Jr. as Inspector Cimarro
Francisco Rubio as Rafael Cimarro
René Strickler as Omar "El Leopardo" Contreras
Victor Noriega as Daniel Velarde
Maya Mishalska as Blanca Silva de Contreras/Ivette Dorleaque
Diana Golden as Mercedes
Rafael del Villar as Tomás
Marina Marín as Micaela Vidal
Mario Casillas as Lic. Lozada
María Dolores Oliva as Coralia
Justo Martínez as Cosme
Maricarmen Vela as Doña Mimí
Juan Ángel Esparza as Reynaldo
Teo Tapia as Dr. Duran
Maite Embil as Leticia de Lizárraga
Archie Lanfranco as Gustavo Lizárraga
Adrián Martiñón as El Piraña
Eduardo Rivera as Doctor in Red Cross
Delia Casanova as Sra. Márgara Riquelme
Alejandro Ruiz as Judge del Villar
Patricio Borghetti as Pato
Franco Gala as Pablo Cisneros
Ramón Cabrer as Himself
Luis Bayardo as Judge

Remake
The show was adapted to a Vietnamese drama called "Tóc rối" (English: Tangled Hair).

Soundtrack
Solo Tu (La Nueva Banda Timbiriche)
Esta Soledad (Maite Perroni)
Contigo (Maite Perroni)
Separada De Ti (Maite Perroni)
Ave Maria (Maite Perroni)
Y No Sé Que Pasó (Angels)
Si Tu No Vuelves (Miguel Bosé)
Lejos Estamos Mejor (Motel)
Niño (Belanova)
No Me Quiero Enamorar (Kalimba)
Un Dos Un Dos Tres (El Simbolo)
Digale  (David Bisbal)
Caricia De Mi Alma (Maya Mishalska)
Perdon (Alejandro y Vicente Fernandez)
La Gota Fria (Carlos Vives)
La Fuerza Del Corazo  (Alejandro Sanz) 
Una Mujer Salvaje  (Grupo Luz Eterna)
Vete Ya  (Valentin Elizalde)

Awards and nominations

References

External links

 at esmas.com 

2008 telenovelas
Mexican telenovelas
2008 Mexican television series debuts
2009 Mexican television series endings
Television shows set in Mexico City
Televisa telenovelas
Mexican television series based on Venezuelan television series
Spanish-language telenovelas